Feucht is a market town and municipality southeast of Nuremberg in the district of Nürnberger Land in Bavaria, Germany. The name Feucht is derived from the Old High German noun "viuhtje" - "fichta", which is the spruce tree (vernacularly Féichdn). As of 31 December 2019, Feucht had a population of 14,050. Hermann Oberth (1894–1989), one of the early fathers of space travel, lived for many years and died in Feucht.

History

Since the Middle Ages Feucht has been a centre for beekeeping and honey production referred to as Zeidlerei. Lebkuchen, the famous gingerbread of Nuremberg, is based on honey from Feucht. Feucht was also the location of the kaserne of the U.S. Army's 4/11th Armored Cavalry Regiment, until it's recall to Fort Lewis, Washington in 1992 during the drawdown of the USAREUR.

Points of interest

Culture

 Hermann Oberth Space Travel Museum - This small museum is located at Pfinzingstrasse 12-14 and is open on weekends. It features some books, models, awards and recognitions which belonged to Hermann Oberth. There are also some rocket engines and models which explain various aspects of space travel.
 Zeidel-Museum - Pfinzingstrasse 6, open on Sunday afternoons from 1:30 to 5:30 is a museum about the history and production of honey, which has a long history in Feucht.  It was one of the main ingredients in Lebkuchen, a product of nearby Nuremberg.

Business
The biggest industrial businesses in Feucht are Excella (pharma), ATOTECH, (Electronic) and Fella (agricultural forage harvesting machinery).

Recreation

Feucht is home to a couple of small lakes. Its location near the Imperial Woods makes it a popular destination for hiking, cycling and outdoor recreation.

Transport

Feucht has numerous bus stops throughout the town and is serviced by VGN/VAG busline with direct service to Nuremberg.

Feucht is located on the Autobahn A9 (motorway / interstate) and the Federal Highway B8.

Feucht has a station on the Nuremberg–Regensburg line and is served by both RB regional trains and Nuremberg S-Bahn trains.

References

Nürnberger Land